Washington Township is one of the twelve townships of Van Wert County, Ohio, United States.  The 2000 census found 5,228 people in the township, 1,592 of whom lived in the unincorporated portions of the township.

Geography
Located in the eastern part of the county, it borders the following townships:
Jackson Township - north
Monterey Township, Putnam County - northeast
Jennings Township, Putnam County - east
Marion Township, Allen County - southeast
Jennings Township - south
York Township - southwest corner
Ridge Township - west
Hoaglin Township - northwest corner

Part of the city of Delphos is located in southeastern Washington Township, along the border with Allen County, and the village of Middle Point is located in the western part of the township.

Van Wert County's farthest eastern point is located in Washington Township.

Name and history
It is one of forty-three Washington Townships statewide.

Government
The township is governed by a three-member board of trustees, who are elected in November of odd-numbered years to a four-year term beginning on the following January 1. Two are elected in the year after the presidential election and one is elected in the year before it. There is also an elected township fiscal officer, who serves a four-year term beginning on April 1 of the year after the election, which is held in November of the year before the presidential election. Vacancies in the fiscal officership or on the board of trustees are filled by the remaining trustees.

References

External links
County website

Townships in Van Wert County, Ohio
Townships in Ohio